The Iezer Mountains are a mountain range in the Southern Carpathians in Romania. It is part of the Făgăraș Mountains group.

Location
The Iezer Mountains are located between the Făgăraș Mountains to the northwest and the Piatra Craiului Mountains to the east. The rivers Dâmbovița and Râul Târgului take their source in the Iezer Mountains. The range lies completely within Argeș County.

Peaks
The highest peaks are:
Roșu 2,470 m
Iezerul Mare 2,462 m
Păpușa 2,391 m

References

Mountain ranges of Romania
Mountain ranges of the Southern Carpathians